Dirk Pieter van der Berg (born 2 March 1967) is a former South African cricketer who was active during the early 1990s.

Born in Virginia, a gold mining town in Orange Free State Province, van der Berg's sole recorded match came for an Orange Free State Country Districts side during the 1992–93 South African season. Played in early October 1992, the game came during that season's edition of the Total Power Series, a limited-overs knockout competition which, from the 1989–90 season, had included "country districts" sides in the first round in order to bolster the number of teams. Orange Free State Country Districts met Northern Transvaal in the first round, in what was to be the side's only match at List-A level. With his side batting first, van der Berg was dismissed for a duck coming in third in the batting order, bowled by a future South African ODI player, Mike Rindel. He bowled two overs of right-arm off spin in Northern Transvaal's innings, as they went on to win easily, by eight wickets.

References

External links

1967 births
Living people
People from Matjhabeng Local Municipality
Afrikaner people
South African people of Dutch descent
Orange Free State Country Districts cricketers
South African cricketers